Louise Camuto (née Drevenstam) is a Swedish model and businesswoman. She was Miss Sweden 1989, and finished as first runner-up in the Miss Universe 1989 pageant. Later that year, she was crowned Miss Scandinavia, in Helsinki.  She was formerly Chief Creative Officer at Camuto Group, owned by her late husband, businessman Vince Camuto. She attended the New York School of Interior Design, Christie's Education and Columbia University's Executive Management program. She has worked as an executive, holding the position of President of Marketing and Communications at Camuto Group, a company owned by her husband Vince Camuto, who died in 2015.

References 

Living people
Miss Sweden winners
Miss Universe 1989 contestants
Swedish female models
Swedish jewelry designers
20th-century Swedish businesswomen
20th-century Swedish businesspeople
Year of birth missing (living people)
21st-century Swedish businesswomen
21st-century Swedish businesspeople